Ionochromic materials, similar to photochromic, thermochromic and other chromic materials, alter colour in the presence of a factor and reverse to their initial state when the factor is removed. The factor which causes colour change in ionochromic substances are ions. A flow of ions through an ionochromic material results in a reaction/colour change from the material. This material is in many ways similar to electrochromic materials which change colour when electrons flow through them. Electrons, just like anions, carry a negative charge. Both electrochromic and ionochromic substances have their colour change activated by the flow of charged particles. Ionochromic substances are suitable for detection of charged particles. Some ionochromic substances can be used as indicators for complexometric titrations.

Chromism
Complexometric indicators